Khao Chang (เขาช้าง), is a 45 m high hill in Phang Nga Province, Thailand. It is in Phang Nga town behind city hall.

At the foot of the mountain and within the Wat Phra Paht Phra Chim temple compound there is a cave known as Phung Chang, 'Elephant Belly Cave', with stalactites and stalagmites. Some parts of the cave are permanently flooded but they are accessible by boat.

Symbolism

Khao Chang has symbolic significance in Phang Nga. Its massive silhouette looks like a crouched elephant. Khao Chang appears in the provincial seal of Phang Nga.

See also
List of mountains in Thailand
Phang Nga Province
Seals of the provinces of Thailand

References

External links
Khao Chang (Elephant Mountain)—Phang-nga, Thailand. - Animal Memorials on Waymarking.com
Phang Nga Official Website  

Geography of Phang Nga province
Hills of Thailand